Enikő Berkes (born 3 October 1975) is a Hungarian former competitive ice dancer. With Szilárd Tóth, she is the 1993 Golden Spin of Zagreb bronze medalist and 1994 national champion. They represented Hungary at the 1994 Winter Olympics.

Career

Partnership with Tóth 
Berkes began her partnership with Szilárd Tóth by 1991. They competed in the final segment at four ISU Championships, placing 15th at the 1992 World Junior Championships in Hull, Quebec, Canada; 20th at the 1993 European Championships in Helsinki, Finland; 24th at the 1994 European Championships in Copenhagen, Denmark; and 23rd at the 1995 European Championships in Dortmund, Germany.

Berkes/Tóth were named in Hungary's team to the 1994 Winter Olympics in Hamar. They finished 20th in Norway.

Partnership with Szentirmai 
In 1995, Berkes teamed up with Endre Szentirmai. They were coached by Krisztina Regőczy in Budapest. After winning the national title, they placed 18th at the 1996 European Championships in Sofia, Bulgaria. At the 1996 World Championships, held in Edmonton, Alberta, Canada, they qualified to the free dance and finished 24th overall.

Post-competitive career 
Berkes is an ISU technical specialist for Hungary in the ice dancing category. She served as the assistant technical specialist at the 2008 Four Continents Championships; as the technical specialist at the 2007 NHK Trophy as the assistant technical specialist during the 2006 Trophée Eric Bompard, and for many ISU Junior Grand Prix events.

Results 
GP: Champions Series (Grand Prix)

With Szentirmai

With Tóth

References

Navigation

Hungarian female ice dancers
Olympic figure skaters of Hungary
Figure skaters at the 1994 Winter Olympics
International Skating Union technical specialists
1975 births
Living people